Passes Peak is a pyramidal peak, 535 m, standing next south of Mount Carroll and 2 nautical miles (3.7 km) south of the head of Hope Bay, at the northeast end of Antarctic Peninsula. First charted in 1945 by the Falkland Islands Dependencies Survey (FIDS), and so named because it lies between two passes used by Hope Bay sledging parties in traveling to Duse Bay and to the head of Depot Glacier.

See also
Summit Ridge

References

Mountains of Trinity Peninsula